Kanaighat is an upazila of Sylhet Division of Bangladesh. It is the second-largest upazila (sub-district) of Sylhet District after Gowainghat Upazila. It is named after the town of Kanaighat, which is also the only municipality in the Upazila.

Etymology
There are two theories regarding the naming of Kanaighat. The word ghat in the Bengali language refers to a flight of steps leading down to a river. The Kanaighat Bazar, which the Kanaighat Upazila is named after, sits on the banks of the Surma River. The most popular theory is that there was a boatman (majhi) by the name of Kanai who lived here. Others suggest that it was named after Kanai Chowdhury of Mulagul, who was a powerful courtier in the Jaintia royal court.

History
Kanaighat was formerly under the rule of the Jaintia Kingdom. The British conquered the Jaintia Kingdom on 16 March 1835, finally incorporating its lowland areas into the Sylhet District after 90 years. As a result, the Muslims of Sylhet found the opportunity to start settling in sparsely-populated Kanaighat. In order to maintain peace and discipline, the British colonials established a thana (police stationa and administrative headquarters) atop the Jhorna Tila in Lakshipur Mauza of Mulagul Pargana in 1841. The headquarters was moved to Kanaighat Bazar/Sadar in 1880. Establishments of middle schools, madrasas and mosques from 1905 marked the start of an intellectual awakening in Kanaighat, which had a reputation of ignorance due to its long time in the Jaintia Kingdom.

On 23 March 1922, the Kanaighat Islamia Madrasa set to host their annual jalsa (presided by Ibrahim Ali Tashna) but the British Raj had outlawed it and declared Section 144 throughout Kanaighat. Tashna and his committee were not fussed by the ban and subsequently violated Section 144 by continuing the jalsa. J. E. Webster, the Commissioner of Surma Valley, sent a police force to the jalsa at 12pm, who began shooting at the masses. The armed British were able to conduct a swift victory, by shooting down six people dead and injuring 38 others. The six Kanaighatis killed were: Maulvi Abd as-Salam, Muhammad Musa Mia, Abdul Majid, Haji Azizur Rahman and Yasin Mia. The British established a thana (police station and administrative headquarters) in Kanaighat in 1932.

The Kanaighat Community Club was founded in 1961. During the Bangladesh Liberation War of 1971, the Pakistani Army teamed up with Razakars to do a mass killing in Maligram and Gouripur. A memorial was built in Momtazganj. On 4 September 1971, freedom fighter Khwaja Nizamuddin Bhuyan of Comilla fought against the Pakistan Army in Kanaighat for 10 hours. Martyred in Atgram Road, he was laid to rest at Mokimtila. Liaquat Ali Khan (Bir Uttom) of Bagerhat fought and was martyred in Kanaighat's Gouripur in November 1971. Kanaighat was liberated on 4 December 1971 following Pakistani surrender.

On 24 March 1983, the President of Bangladesh, H M Ershad, upgraded Kanaighat's thana status to an upazila as a part of his decentralisation programme. This improved the socio-economic conditions of Kanaighat. The Islamic Library and Public Welfare Association was founded in Mukiganj Bazar (Jhingabari UP) in 1988.

Geography
The Surma River flows through the upazila, and the Lobha River, Dhona River, Deochhai River and Chatal beel are other notable bodies of water in the area. It is bounded by the Indian state of Meghalaya and the Jaintiapur Upazila to its north, Zakiganj and Beanibazar to its south, Meghalaya to its east and Jaintapur and Golapganj to its west.

Demographics
At the 2001 Bangladesh census, Kanaighat had a population of about 2,50,000. It has 29568 households. Males constituted 50.49% of the population, and females 49.51%. The population of those aged 18 and older was 85,855. 

95% of Kanaighat inhabitants adhere to Islam with Hindu minorities forming 4.10% of the total population. 0.2% of Kanaighatis follow Christianity and Buddhism, and 0.3% follow tribal religions. Almost all inhabitants are ethnic Bengalis, with small minorities of Meitei people, Khasi people and a Scotsman by the name of James Leo Ferguson.

Administration
Kanaighat Upazila is divided into the Kanaighat Municipality and nine union parishads: Bara Chatul, Dakshin Banigarm, Jhingrabari, Kanaighat, Paschim Lakshmi Prasad, Satbak (Paschim Dighirpar), Purba Lakshmi Prasad, Purba Dighirpar, and Rajaganj. The union parishads are subdivided into 198 mauzas and 264 villages.

Kanaighat Municipality is subdivided into 9 wards and 26 mahallas.

Education
Kanaighat had an average literacy rate of 100% (7+ years).

| Kanaighat Government College
| 1990

Economy and tourism
Kanaighat contains many popular tourist sites. In addition to its tea gardens, it also has the Lobhachhara Patharkoari stone reserves and the Tamabil land port. Out of its 491 mosques, the Kanaighat Jami Mosque is quite notable.

Notable people 
 Farid Uddin Chowdhury, teacher, businessman and politician
 Habibur Rahman (Tota Mia), member of parliament of the first Jatiya Sangsad
 James Leo Ferguson, tea planter, was born in Kanaighat.
 Mawlana Abdur Rahim (Charipari) (Saint), Founding Principal, Rahimia Alia Madrasha
 Ibrahim Chatuli, scholar, politician and social reformer
Moulvi Abdus Salam (1928-1991), Politician and Minister at Pakistan era
 Abul Haris Chowdhury, Politician and ex-Minister
 Mawlana Hormuzullah (saint), Founding Member, Tabligh Jamat, Bangladesh
Ismail Alam (1868-1937), Urdu poet and activist	
Oliur Rahman (1916-2006), firmer principal of Umarganj Madrasa
Ibrahim Ali Tashna, Islamic scholar, multilingual poet and activist
Mushahid Ahmad Bayampuri (1907-1970), Founding Principal (ex), Kanaighat Darul Ulum Madrasha
 Mr. Tosna (Baul), Lyricist, Composer, Singer

 Muhammad Jalal Uddin, Professor, Dhaka University

 AFM Zakaria, Professor at Shahjalal University of Science & Technology, was born in Joypur, Kanaighat.

References

 
Upazilas of Sylhet District